Mel and George "Do" World War II is a 1990 live album by the American jazz singer Mel Tormé and the British jazz pianist George Shearing.

Track listing
 "Lili Marlene" (Tommie Connor, Hans Leip, Norbert Schultze) – 6:18
 "Love" (Ralph Blane, Hugh Martin) – 6:13
 "Aren't You Glad You're You?" (Johnny Burke, Jimmy Van Heusen) – 5:35
 Duke Ellington Medley: "Cotton Tail"/"I Didn't Know About You"/"Don't Get Around Much Anymore"/"I'm Beginning to See the Light" (Duke Ellington)/(Ellington, Bob Russell)/(Ellington, Russell)/(Don George, Johnny Hodges, Harry James) – 3:39
 "I Don't Want to Walk Without You"/"I'll Walk Alone" (Frank Loesser, Jule Styne)/(Styne, Sammy Cahn) – 4:30
 "I Could Write a Book" (Richard Rodgers, Lorenz Hart) – 5:29
 "A Lovely Way to Spend an Evening" (Harold Adamson, Jimmy McHugh) – 6:18
 "On the Swing Shift"/"The Five O'Clock Whistle" (Harold Arlen, Johnny Mercer)/(Kim Gannon, William C. K. Irwin, Josef Myrow) – 4:17
 "Ac-Cent-Tchu-Ate the Positive" (Mercer, Arlen) – 5:18
 "This is the Army, Mister Jones" (Irving Berlin) – 3:30
 "We Mustn't Say Goodbye" (Al Dubin, James V. Monaco) – 3:13
 "I've Heard That Song Before" (Cahn, Styne) – 4:10
 "I Know Why (and So Do You)" (Harry Warren, Mack Gordon) – 5:15

Personnel
 Mel Tormé - vocals
 George Shearing - piano
 Neil Swainson - double bass
 Donny Osborne - drums

References

1990 live albums
Albums produced by Carl Jefferson
Concord Records live albums
George Shearing live albums
Mel Tormé live albums
Songs about World War II